The Ettamogah Pub is a cartoon pub that was featured in the now defunct Australasian Post magazine. The cartoonist Ken Maynard, loving empty spaces and having nothing around him, enjoyed an area just outside Albury at Table Top, New South Wales, named Ettamogah, thus christening the eponymous name of his now famous pub the "Ettamogah Pub".

Albury
The pub was built by businessman Lindsay Cooper and first opened in 1987. The aim was to create a themed family restaurant which would become a tourist attraction. The timber building featured sloping walls and a distinctive architectural style true to the original cartoon design.

In 2007, the hotel in Albury opened 17 new cabins for accommodation. The site also houses the Ken Maynard Museum and an artwork collection. In 2011, the owner Leigh O’Brien announced plans for a $3 million redevelopment which included the addition of a caravan park and petrol station.

Sunshine Coast
The second Ettamogah Pub opened at the Aussie World theme park at Palmview on the Sunshine Coast in 1989. It was opened by then Premier Mike Ahern. Construction took nine months and it cost $4.5 million. A 1927 Chevrolet sat atop the roof of the building. This followed a flood in the cartoon after which the owners couldn't be bothered to remove the vehicle. To celebrate its 21st year of operations the pub began brewing and selling its own beer.

In 2014, following a dispute over intellectual property rights, this pub has since changed its name and removed any of the cartoon likenesses. In 2018, the pub underwent a substantial redevelopment project which included more than 500 square metres of decking around the front and sides of the building.

Cunderdin

Sydney
The Ettamogah Pub in Sydney, is located on the corner of Merriville and Windsor roads, . It is a copy of the original Ettamogah Pub from Table Top and was opened in 2003. Although the appearance from the outside is a copy of the original the similarities end at the surface as the pub itself (the bar/drinking area) is inside the metal shed like structure adjoined to the rear of the wooden 'pub'. The wooden building is a 'walk through' entrance to the metal shed behind and doesn't share many similarities at all with the original beyond the outside appearance.

Gallery

See also

 List of public houses in Australia
 Tourism in Australia

Notes and references

External links
Ettamogah Pub, Kellyville Ridge, NSW
Ettamogah Pub, Sunshine Coast, QLD – Part of the "Aussieworld" mini theme park

Pubs in New South Wales
Tourist attractions in New South Wales
Novelty buildings in Australia
Pubs in Australia
Pub chains